Lake Badus is a lake in South Dakota, in the United States.

Lake Badus takes its name from a lake of the same name in Switzerland, the native land of a share of the first settlers.

See also
List of lakes in South Dakota

References

Lakes of South Dakota
Lakes of Lake County, South Dakota